Richland High School may refer to:

Richland High School
Richland High School (Mississippi), Richland, Mississippi (Jackson metropolitan area)
Richland High School (Essex, Missouri), Essex, Missouri
Richland High School (Richland, Missouri), Richland, Missouri
Richland High School (North Dakota), Colfax, North Dakota
Richland High School (Texas), North Richland Hills, Texas (Dallas-Fort Worth area)
Richland High School (Washington), Richland, Washington
Richland High School (Tennessee), Lynnville, Tennessee

Similarly named schools
Richland Collegiate High School, Dallas, Texas
West Richland High School, Noble, Illinois
East Richland High School, Olney, Illinois
Richland County Vocational Technical Center, Wahpeton, North Dakota
Pine-Richland High School, Gibsonia, Pennsylvania
Richland Senior High School, Johnstown, Pennsylvania
Richland Northeast High School, Columbia, South Carolina
Lower Richland High School, Hopkins, South Carolina
Richland Center High School, Richland Center, Wisconsin

See also
Richland (disambiguation)
Richland Township (disambiguation)